At the 1991 Mediterranean Games, the athletics events were held at the Olympic Stadium in Athens, Greece. A total of 38 events were contested, of which 23 by male and 15 by female athletes. An exhibition heptathlon also took place, with Algeria's Yasmina Azzizi being the only athlete to compete. Several hundred athletes from fourteen Mediterranean nations took part in the competition.

Nine nations reached the medal table, with eight of them having an athlete top the podium. Italy was dominant, taking eleven gold medals and 38 overall. France was a clear second with nine golds from a haul of 25 medals. Algeria won the next highest number of golds (five), while Spain had the third largest overall medals with thirteen. Morocco also performed well (four golds and twelve in total) as did the host nation Greece (three golds and eleven overall). A total of 22 games records were broken in Athens – this was over half of the event programme and only five field event records were unbeaten by the end of the tournament.

Hassiba Boulmerka won a middle-distance double and went on to win the 1500 metres at the World Championships a month later. Fabienne Ficher was runner-up in the 200 metres but she added two golds to her tally through victories in the relays with the French team. Ezio Madonia won the men's 100 metres and anchored the Italian team to a second gold in the 4×100 metres relay. Italy's Agnese Maffeis broke the games record in the discus throw and also won the shot put silver medal. Paraskevi Patoulidou played a role in three of Greece's medals, taking the women's 100 m gold, silver in the 100 metres hurdles and a bronze in the 4×100 m relay.

Three former Olympic champions featured in Italy's team (Maurizio Damilano, Alessandro Andrei, and Gabriella Dorio). Damilano, who set a games record, won the men's 20 kilometres walk title at that year's world championships, while men's steeplechase winner Azzedine Brahmi became a world bronze medallist in his event. Brahim Boutayeb, the reigning Olympic champion in the 10,000 metres, took the world 5000 metres bronze after his games record performance in Athens.

The games proved a launching point for many less-established athletes: the 1992 Barcelona Olympics saw Mediterranean medallists Boulmerka, Patoulidou, Khalid Skah and Daniel Plaza win an Olympic gold medal. The 1500 m runner-up Rachid El Basir repeated his placing there. Women's 400 m hurdles winner Nezha Bidouane went on to become a two-time world champion and 1500 m champion Gennaro Di Napoli later had two wins at the IAAF World Indoor Championships.

Medal summary

Men

Women

Medal table

† Excludes Yasmina Azzizi's gold in the heptathlon, as this was an exhibition event only.

Participation
Fifteen of the eighteen nations present at the 1991 edition of the games entered athletes into the athletics competition. Lebanon, Libya and Malta did not send any track and field athletes.

References

Results
Affiche officielle des JM d’Athènes 1991. CIJM (1991). Retrieved on 2013-07-28.
Mediterranean Games. GBRAthletics. Retrieved on 2013-07-28.

External links
Official website

1991
Sports at the 1991 Mediterranean Games
Mediterranean Games
1991 Mediterranean Games
1991 Mediterranean Games